Anusuiya Uikey (born 10 April 1957) is a politician and currently serving as the governor of Manipur & formerly of Chhattisgarh. She was elected to the Madhya Pradesh Legislative Assembly from Damua in the 1985 Madhya Pradesh Legislative Assembly election as a member of the Indian National Congress.  She became Minister for Women and Child Development in Arjun Singh cabinet. By 1998, she had crossed over to BJP and was its losing candidate in 1998 Vidhan Sabha election from Damua. She became a member of Rajya Sabha from Madhya Pradesh in 2006.

She was Governor of Chhattisgarh from 16 July 2019 to 12 February 2023 & appointed as Governor of Manipur on 12 February 2023.

References

|-

External links
 Profile on Rajya Sabha website

1957 births
Living people
Madhya Pradesh MLAs 1985–1990
Rajya Sabha members from Madhya Pradesh
Indian National Congress politicians from Madhya Pradesh
Bharatiya Janata Party politicians from Madhya Pradesh
Women members of the Madhya Pradesh Legislative Assembly
People from Chhindwara
20th-century Indian women politicians
20th-century Indian politicians
Governors of Chhattisgarh
Women members of the Rajya Sabha
Women state governors of India
21st-century Indian women politicians
21st-century Indian politicians